Aulolepis (from  , 'pipe' and   'scale') is an extinct genus of prehistoric bony fish that lived during the upper Cenomanian.

References

Late Cretaceous fish
Cretaceous fish of Europe
Prehistoric bony fish genera
Taxa named by Louis Agassiz